Naomi Smith may refer to:

Naomi Smith (artist), Canadian artist
Naomi Smith (campaigner), British political campaigner
Naomi Louise Smith, a British schoolgirl murdered in 1995